Thisayanvilai is a special grade town panchayat. It is one of the taluks in Tirunelveli district in the Indian state of Tamil Nadu.

Demographics
 India census, Tisaiyanvilai has a population of 23,702. Males constitute 48% of the population and females 52%. Tisaiyanvilai has an average literacy rate of 91.12%, higher than the state average of 80.09. Male literacy is 94.10%, and female literacy is 88.22%. In Tisaiyanvilai, 11.35% of the population is under 6 years of age. Of the late, many from the district immigrate there, in search of better employment, making it an immigration hub.

Connectivity
The town is well connected with the district capital Tirunelveli by SH - 89 road. Bus services to Tirunelveli, Nagercoil and Tiruchendur are regularly available. Buses to Madurai, Coimbatore, Tiruppur, Ramanathapuram, Velankanni and Chennai are available. The nearest port and airport is in Thoothukudi.

Education
There are many schools in Thisayanvilai. Sri Ramakrishna higher secondary school, Lions matriculation high school, Daniel Thomas Group of Schools, Holy Redeemers higher secondary school, Jayarrajesh matriculation hr sec school, Malavidthya school, VSR international school, Samariah St.John's higher secondary school,  Pothihai public school, Hindu primary school and Stella Mary's Girls High School are among them. The taluk also has an engineering college named as VV college of Engineering and one government arts and science college named as Mano Government Arts and Science College.

Industry
Being nearer to mineral-rich beaches, Thisayanvilai has one of the India's largest Garnet and Ilmenite exporting company named VV Minerals.

Medical Facilities
The key aspects of any developing town is determined by the medical facilities available. Having said that, Thisayanvillai has well equipped multi-speciality hospitals and maternity care clinics. Chidambaram Hospital - Navalady Road, Santhi Hospitals - Uvari Road, Palkani Hospital - Itamozhi Road, Jerry Hospital - Udankudi Road are some of the notable hospitals in the Town.

Notable Shopping Options
Thisayanvillai has wide range of automobile showrooms, hardware showrooms, restaurants and Kids centric showrooms. Jeff and Juvan Baby Shop, situated near Chidambaram Hospitals, Navalady Road is one of the notable option for all the Just born products and accessories in the Town. The Public has enough of automobile options in TVS, Yamaha, Bajaj, Hero, Honda. The electric automobile business is also growing day by day
</ref>

References

Cities and towns in Tirunelveli district